Chatterbox Falls is a waterfall in British Columbia, Canada, located at the head or end of Princess Louisa Inlet.  It is part of Loquilts River which empties into the inlet. The falls are a popular destination for boaters around the world and are in Princess Louisa Marine Provincial Park, part of BC Parks' marine park system which manages the area with the cooperation of the Princess Louisa International Society.

Just upstream from Chatterbox Falls lies the  James Bruce Falls, which is the tallest waterfall in North America.

Gallery

References

External links

BCGNIS Geographical Geographical Name Detail for Chatterbox Falls
Princess Louisa Marine Provincial Park
Waterfalls of the Pacific Northwest - Chatterbox Falls

Waterfalls of British Columbia
Sunshine Coast (British Columbia)
New Westminster Land District